Clayton Municipal Airport  is a city-owned, public-use airport located two nautical miles (4 km) west of the central business district of Clayton, a city in Barbour County, Alabama, United States.

This airport is included in the FAA's National Plan of Integrated Airport Systems for 2011–2015 and 2009–2013, both of which categorized it as a general aviation facility.

Facilities and aircraft 
Clayton Municipal Airport covers an area of 56 acres (23 ha) at an elevation of 435 feet (133 m) above mean sea level. It has one runway designated 9/27 with an asphalt surface measuring 5,010 by 80 feet (1,527 x 24 m). For the 12-month period ending November 11, 2010, the airport had 1,560 general aviation aircraft operations, an average of 130 per month.

References

External links 
 Aerial image as of 21 January 1992 from USGS The National Map
 

Airports in Alabama
Transportation buildings and structures in Barbour County, Alabama